The men's 3000 metres steeplechase  event at the 1936 Summer Olympic Games took place August 3 and August 8.  The final was won by Volmari Iso-Hollo of Finland.

Results

Heats

The fastest four runners in each of the three heats advanced to the final round.

Heat 1

Heat 2

Heat 3

Final

Key: DNF = Did not finish, WR = World record

References

Athletics at the 1936 Summer Olympics
Steeplechase at the Olympics
Men's events at the 1936 Summer Olympics